Mueang Phayao is the capital district (amphoe mueang) of Phayao province, northern Thailand.

Geography
Neighboring districts are (from the north clockwise): Mai Chai of Phayao Province; Pa Daet of Chiang Rai province; Phu Kamyao, Dok Khamtai of Phayao Province; Ngao and Wang Nuea of Lampang province.

Doi Luang, the highest point of the Phi Pan Nam Range is at the western end of the district.

History
In 1917 Phayao district was renamed Mueang Phayao. In 1938 the word "mueang" was removed, as only the capital districts of the provinces were to have that name. With the creation of Phayao Province in 1977, the district was named Mueang Phayao again.

Administration

Central administration 
Mueang Phayao district is divided into 15 sub-districts (tambons), which are further subdivided into 172 administrative villages (mubans).

Missing numbers belong to tambons which now form Phu Kamyao District.

Local administration 
There is one town (Thesaban Mueang) in the district:
 Phayao consisting of sub-district Wiang, Mae Tam.

There are nine sub-district municipalities (thesaban tambons) in the district:
 Tha Wang Thong consisting of sub-district Tha Wang Thong.
 Ban Tam consisting of sub-district Ban Tam.
 Mae Puem consisting of sub-district Mae Puem.
 Mae Ka consisting of sub-district Mae Ka.
 Ban Tom consisting of sub-district Ban Tom.
 Ban Mai consisting of sub-district Ban Mai.
 Ban Sang consisting of sub-district Ban Sang.
 Tha Champi consisting of sub-district Tha Champi.
 San Pa Muang consisting of sub-district San Pa Muang.

There are four sub-district administrative organizations (SAO) in the district:
 Mae Na Ruea consisting of sub-district Mae Na Ruea.
 Ban Tun consisting of sub-district Ban Tun.
 Cham Pa Wai consisting of sub-district Cham Pa Wai.
 Mae Sai consisting of sub-district Mae Sai.

References

External links
amphoe.com (Thai)

Mueang Phayao